Murk van Phelsum (6 August 1732, probably Leeuwarden - 21 August 1779, Sneek) was a Dutch physician, who was the namesake for the lizard genus Phelsuma.

Van Phelsum started his medical studies on 17 November 1754 at the university of Franeker (Netherlands), where he later earned his doctorate. He settled down as a medical doctor first in Bolsward and from 1764 in Sneek.

He wrote:

Historia physiologica ascaridum (Leeuwarden, 1762)
Explicatio patrium pythographiae L. Plukneti (Haarlem, 1769)
Natuurkundige verhandeling over de wormen die veeltijds in de darmen der menschen gevonden worden. (Leeuwarden, 1767), translated into German by Joh. Weisse (Gotha 1780-92)
Vertoog over de gemakkelijkste wijze om geknelde darmbreuken binnen te brengen. (Sneek 1772)
Brief aan den heer C. Nozeman over de gewelfstekken of zeeëgelen, waarachter gevoegd zijn twee beschrijvingen, de eene van een zeker soort zeewier en de andere van maden in een vuile verzwering gevonden. (Rotterdam 1775)
Twee brieven rakende de verhandeling van den heer Tissot over de vallende ziekte. (Amsterdam 1776)
Verhandelingen over tot de genees- en natuurkunde behoorende onderwerpen. (Franeker 1776)

His library was sold on 13 March 1780.

References

Further reading
Mijn Stads- en Dorpskroniek van Friesland (Leeuwarden 1930) I, 196, 272, 298, 316.

1730 births
1779 deaths
18th-century Dutch physicians
People from Sneek
University of Franeker alumni